This is a complete bibliography of the works by American fantasy fiction author Raymond E. Feist.

Bibliography

Riftwar Cycle

The Riftwar Saga
 Magician (1982), republished in two parts in the United States in 1986 as Magician: Apprentice and Magician: Master
 Silverthorn (1985)
 A Darkness at Sethanon (1986)

The Empire Trilogy
 Daughter of the Empire (1987) with Janny Wurts
 Servant of the Empire (1990) with Janny Wurts
 Mistress of the Empire (1992) with Janny Wurts

The Riftwar Legacy
 Krondor: The Betrayal (1998) – A novelization of the 1993 PC game Betrayal at Krondor
 Krondor: The Assassins (1999)
 Krondor: Tear of the Gods (2000) – A novelization of the 1998 PC game Return to Krondor
 Jimmy and the Crawler (2013) – a novella replacing the cancelled novels Krondor: The Crawler and Krondor: The Dark Mage

Legends of the Riftwar
 Honoured Enemy (2001) with William R. Forstchen, aka Honored Enemy
 Murder in LaMut (2002) with Joel Rosenberg
 Jimmy the Hand (2003) with S. M. Stirling

Krondor's Sons
 Prince of the Blood (1989)
 The King's Buccaneer (1992)

The Serpentwar Saga
 Shadow of a Dark Queen (1994)
 Rise of a Merchant Prince (1995)
 Rage of a Demon King (1997)
 Shards of a Broken Crown (1998)

Conclave of Shadows
 Talon of the Silver Hawk (2002)
 King of Foxes (2003)
 Exile's Return (2004)

The Darkwar Saga
 Flight of the Nighthawks (2005)
 Into a Dark Realm (2006)
 Wrath of a Mad God (2008)

The Demonwar Saga
 Rides a Dread Legion (2009)
 At the Gates of Darkness (2009)

The Chaoswar Saga
 A Kingdom Besieged (2011)
 A Crown Imperiled (2012)
 Magician's End (2013)

Companion works

 Midkemia: The Chronicles of Pug (2013) with Stephen Abrams – "coffee table book" with maps and illustrations.

The Firemane Saga
 King of Ashes (2018)
 Queen of Storms (2020)
 Master of Furies (2022)

Stand-alone novels
 Faerie Tale (1988)

Short stories
 Profit and the Grey Assassin (1982) (set in the Riftwar Universe) in Fantasy Book (journal)
 Geroldo's Incredible Trick (1997) in A Magic Lovers Treasury of the Fantastic (ed. Margaret Weis)
 The Wood Boy (1998) in Legends (ed. Robert Silverberg)
 One to Go (2002) in Thieves World: Turning Points (ed. Lynn Abbey)
 The Messenger (2003) in Legends II (ed. Robert Silverberg)
 Watchfire (2004) with Janny Wurts in Flights: Extreme Visions of Fantasy (ed. Al Sarrantonio)

Role playing games
 Tulan of the Isles (1981) with Stephen Abrams, published by Midkemia Press
 Jonril: Gateway to the Sunken Lands (1982) with Stephen Abrams published by Midkemia Press

References

Bibliographies by writer
Bibliographies of American writers
Fantasy bibliographies